Starokirgizovo (İśke Qırğıź) is a rural locality (a selo) in Novomedvedevsky Selsoviet, Ilishevsky District, Bashkortostan, Russia. The population was 439 as of 2010. There are 5 streets.

Geography 
Starokirgizovo is located 34 km north of Verkhneyarkeyevo (the district's administrative centre) by road. Novomedvedevo is the nearest rural locality.

References 

Rural localities in Ilishevsky District